In quantum many-body physics, topological degeneracy is a phenomenon in which the ground state of a gapped many-body Hamiltonian becomes degenerate in the limit of large system size such that the degeneracy cannot be lifted by any local perturbations.

Applications

Topological degeneracy can be used to protect qubits which allows topological quantum computation.  It is believed  that topological degeneracy implies topological order (or long-range entanglement ) in the ground state. Many-body states with topological degeneracy are described by topological quantum field theory at low energies.

Background

Topological degeneracy was first introduced to physically define topological order.
In two-dimensional space, the topological degeneracy depends on the topology of space, and the topological degeneracy on high genus Riemann  surfaces encode all information on the quantum dimensions and the fusion algebra of the quasiparticles. In particular, the topological degeneracy on torus is equal to the number of quasiparticles types.

The topological degeneracy also appears in the situation with topological defects (such as vortices, dislocations, holes in 2D sample, ends of a 1D sample, etc.), where the topological degeneracy depends on the number of defects. Braiding those topological defect leads to topologically protected non-Abelian geometric phase, which can be used to perform topologically protected quantum computation.

Topological degeneracy of topological order can be defined on a closed space or an open space with gapped boundaries or gapped domain 
walls, including both Abelian topological orders 
and non-Abelian topological orders.

 The application of these types of systems for quantum computation has been proposed. In certain generalized cases, one can also design the systems with topological interfaces enriched or extended by global or gauge symmetries.

The topological degeneracy also appear in non-interacting fermion systems (such as p+ip superconductors) with trapped defects (such as vortices). In non-interacting fermion systems, there is only one type of topological degeneracy
 is the number of the defects (such as the number of  vortices).
Such topological degeneracy is referred as "Majorana zero-mode" on the defects.

In contrast, there are many types of topological degeneracy for interacting systems.

A systematic description of topological degeneracy is given by tensor category (or monoidal category) theory.

See also

 Topological order
 Quantum topology
 Topological defect
 Topological quantum field theory
 Topological quantum number
 Majorana fermion

References 

Quantum phases
Condensed matter physics